Svein Bredo Østlien (born 2 July 1943) is a retired Norwegian football midfielder. He spent most of his career in Raufoss, but also four season in Lyn. Østlien also represented Norway as an U19, U21 and senior international.

References

1943 births
Living people
People from Vestre Toten
Norwegian footballers
Raufoss IL players
Lyn Fotball players
Norway youth international footballers
Norway under-21 international footballers
Norway international footballers
Association football midfielders
Sportspeople from Innlandet